Sir Michael Eliot Howard  (29 November 1922 – 30 November 2019) was an English military historian, formerly Chichele Professor of the History of War, Honorary Fellow of All Souls College, Regius Professor of Modern History at the University of Oxford, Robert A. Lovett Professor of Military and Naval History at Yale University, and founder of the Department of War Studies, King's College London. In 1958, he co-founded the International Institute for Strategic Studies.

Howard was described in the Financial Times as "Britain's greatest living historian". The Guardian described him as "Britain's foremost expert on conflict".

Early life
Howard was born on 29 November 1922 in the village of Ashmore in Dorset. He was the youngest son of Geoffrey Howard and Edith. He was educated at Wellington College and Christ Church, Oxford. He graduated with a Bachelor of Arts (BA) degree in 1946, which was later promoted to Master of Arts (MA) in 1948.

Howard joined the British Army and was commissioned as a second lieutenant into the Coldstream Guards on 4 December 1942. He was given the service number 253901. He fought in the Italian Campaign, serving with the 3rd Battalion, Coldstream Guards, and came ashore during the landings at Salerno in September 1943. On 27 January 1944, during the First Battle of Monte Cassino, he was awarded the Military Cross (MC) "in recognition of gallant and distinguished services in Italy".

Academic career
After Oxford, Howard began his teaching career at King's College London, where he helped to found the Department of War Studies. From his position at King's he was one of Britain's most influential figures in developing strategic studies as a discipline that brought together government, military, and academia to think about defence and national security more broadly and deeply than had been done before.
Assistant Lecturer in History (1947), Lecturer (1950–3), Reader in War Studies and finally Professor of War Studies (1953–63), King's College London.
Chichele Professor of History of War (from 1977) and Fellow, All Souls College (from 1968 to 1980).
Regius Professor of Modern History and Fellow of Oriel College, Oxford [Honorary Fellow, 1990] (from 1980 to 1989).
Robert A. Lovett Professor of Military and Naval History, Yale University (from 1989 to 1993).
Quondam Fellow, All Souls College (from 1980 to 2014).
Honorary Fellow, All Souls College (from 2014).

He was one of the founders of the International Institute for Strategic Studies. From his family, education, and service in the Guards, he had extensive connections at the higher levels of British society, and he worked them astutely to further his intellectual goals. He had close connections in the Labour Party but was also consulted as an advisor by Margaret Thatcher..

Historical writing
Howard was best known for expanding military history beyond the traditional campaigns and battles accounts to include wider discussions about the sociological significance of war.  In his account of the Franco-Prussian War of 1870–71, Howard looked at how the Prussian and French armies reflected the social structure of the two nations. He was also a leading interpreter of the writings of the Prussian military thinker Carl von Clausewitz, including preparing a translation of On War with the American historian Peter Paret.

In addition, in both his inaugural and concluding lectures as Regius Professor, and in his popular and influential War in European History, Howard stressed the difference between traditional military history, which seeks to identify easily applicable lessons for the present from the history of past wars and military campaigns, and his own approach, which stresses the uniqueness of the historical past and the impossibility of deriving such lessons to guide modern strategic and tactical choices.

In 1985, he delivered the Huizinga Lecture in the Dutch city of Leiden, under the title: 1945: End of an Era. Howard helped found the Department of War Studies and the Liddell Hart Centre for Military Archives at King's College London. He was president emeritus of the International Institute for Strategic Studies, which he also helped to establish, and a fellow of the British Academy.

Awards and honours
Howard was appointed a Commander of the Order of the British Empire (CBE) in the 1977 Birthday Honours and a Knight Bachelor in the 1986 Birthday Honours. He was later appointed to the Order of the Companions of Honour (CH) for services to military studies in the 2002 Birthday Honours and to the Order of Merit (OM) in 2005. In 1988 he was elected a member of the Royal Swedish Academy of War Sciences. In 1992, he was awarded the Samuel Eliot Morison Prize for lifetime achievement given by the Society for Military History.

Work
The Coldstream Guards, co-written with John Sparrow, 1920–1946, 1951.
Disengagement in Europe, 1958.
The Franco-Prussian War: The German Invasion of France, 1870–1871, 1961.  Republished by Methuen, 1981.   
Lord Haldane and the Territorial Army, 1967.
The Mediterranean Strategy in the Second World War, 1967.
Grand Strategy, August 1942 – September 1943, Volume IV, Grand Strategy series, History of the Second World War (1970)
Studies in War and Peace, 1970.
The Continental Commitment: The Dilemma of British Defence Policy in the Era of Two World Wars, 1972.
War in European History, 1976 [latest revised edition, 2009].  
 Carl von Clausewitz, On War, 1977, edited and translated by M. E. Howard and Peter Paret.
Soldiers and Governments: Nine Studies in Civil Military Relations, 1978.
War and the Liberal Conscience, 1978 [new edition, 2008].
Restraints on War: Studies in the Limitation of Armed Conflict, 1979 edited by M. E. Howard.
Clausewitz, 1983 [originally a volume in the Oxford University Press "Past Masters" series, reissued in 2000 as Clausewitz: A Very Short Introduction].  
 The Causes of War Harvard University Press; 2 edition (1 January 1984)
Strategic Deception in World War II, 1990, (Volume 5 of British Intelligence in the Second World War; series edited by F. H. Hinsley; Cambridge University Press). 
The Lessons of History, 1989.
The Laws of War: Constraints on Warfare in the Western World, edited by M. E Howard, George J. Andrepoulous and Mark R. Schulman.  
The Invention of Peace, 2000.

The First World War, 2003 [reissued as The First World War: A Very Short Introduction, 2007].
Captain Professor: A Life in War and Peace (autobiography), 2006  
Liberation or Catastrophe? Reflections on the History of the 20th Century, 2007
Fighting with Pride LGBT in the Armed Forces, chapter 4, 2019 edited by Craig Jones

Notes

References
Freedman, Lawrence; Hayes, Paul & O'Neil, Robert War, Strategy and International Politics: Essays in Honour of Sir Michael Howard, Oxford: Oxford University Press, 1992.   Also available as an e-book. 
 Halewood, Louis, and David Morgan-Owen. "Captains of War: History in Professional Military Education." The RUSI Journal (2021): 1-9.
 Hattendorf, John B. "The Study of War History at Oxford, 1862–1990." in The Limitations of Military Power (Palgrave Macmillan, London, 1990) pp. 3-61.

Skaggs, David Curtis "Michael Howard and the Dimensions of Military History" Military Affairs, Volume 49, 1985. pages 179–183. 
 Strachan, Hew. "Michael Howard and the dimensions of military history." War in History 27.4 (2020): 536-551. online

External links

Great Thinkers: Hew Strachan FBA on Michael Howard FBA podcast, The British Academy

1922 births
2019 deaths
British Army personnel of World War II
Coldstream Guards officers
Recipients of the Military Cross
British historians of espionage
Historians of World War I
Historians of World War II
Fellows of Oriel College, Oxford
Fellows of All Souls College, Oxford
Members of the Order of Merit
Members of the Order of the Companions of Honour
Commanders of the Order of the British Empire
Fellows of the British Academy
Members of the Royal Swedish Academy of War Sciences
Knights Bachelor
LGBT historians
People educated at Wellington College, Berkshire
Editors of the Round Table Journal
Alumni of Christ Church, Oxford
Academics of King's College London
Fellows of King's College London
Yale University faculty
British military writers
British military historians
British autobiographers
Regius Professors of History (University of Oxford)
20th-century British writers
21st-century British writers
20th-century British historians
21st-century British historians
Chichele Professors of the History of War
Fellows of the Royal Historical Society
English LGBT people
Military personnel from Dorset